The 1933 Portsmouth Spartans season was their fourth in the league and final season before becoming the Detroit Lions. The team failed to improve on their previous season's output of 6–2–4, losing five games. They failed to qualify for the playoffs.

Schedule
The Spartans started out fast with a 5–1 mark, just a half-game behind the first place Bears (5–0). After splitting their next two contests, Portsmouth (at 6–2) was still within half a game of Chicago (6–1–1). But the Spartans would lose their next three games, including back-to-back defeats to the Bears to close the season. The Spartans were sold and headed north for the 1934 season, becoming the Detroit Lions. Ironically, the team would return for one last game at Universal Stadium when the Lions' October 28 contest against failing Cincinnati Reds franchise was moved from the Queen City to Portsmouth; Detroit won, 38–0, in the last NFL game played in the small Ohio town.

Standings

References

External links 
1933 Portsmouth Spartans at Pro Football Reference
1933 Portsmouth Spartans at jt-sw.com
1933 Portsmouth Spatans at The Football Database

Detroit Lions seasons
Portsmouth Spartans
Portsmouth Spartans